The Samsung Wave III S8600  (or "Samsung Wave III") is a smartphone running  the Bada 2.0 operating system designed by Samsung, which was commercially released on August, 2011. The Wave is a slim touchscreen phone powered by "Scorpion" CPU, which includes 1.4 GHz ARM Cortex-8 CPU and a powerful graphics engine, "Super LCD" screen and 720p high-definition video capture capabilities. Shortage of Super AMOLED screens was one of the primary reasons for the release of this model.

Hardware features

Design 

The phone is made of mostly metal alloy and is measured at 12.9 mm thick. In terms of form factor, it is a slate style featuring 3 physical buttons on the front: call, reject/ shutdown, and main menu button.

Screen 

The screen is a  capacitive touchscreen Super LCD with an anti-smudge oleophobic coating on top of the scratch-resistant tempered-glass (Gorilla Glass Display) touch panel which has been shown to be capable of resisting extreme friction (scratch-resistant). The screen resolution is 800x480 WVGA and an area of 45.5 cm^2 (~233 ppi).

Processor 

The phone features a Scorpion processor Qualcomm S2 MSM8255T 1.4 GHz SoC, which internally contains an ARM Cortex A8 CPU core.

Camera 

The phone features a 5 megapixel which supports 2592 × 1944 pixels, along with autofocus, LED flash, Geo-tagging, face, blink detection, image stabilization, touch focus, etc. Other than these features it has various shooting modes such as beauty shot, smile shot, continuous, panorama and vintage shot. As a camcorder it is able to shoot 720p HD recording (1280x720) at 30 FPS with flash.

Other features 

Other feature include A-GPS, 2 GB/8 GB of internal storage with a microSDHC slot for an additional 32 GB. It also has a magnetometer, a proximity sensor, an accelerometer, 5.1-channel surround sound Mobile Theater, music recognition, a fake call service, smart search, Social Hub and it is the first phone to support Bluetooth version 3.0.

In addition to Bluetooth 3.0, the phone also features Wi-Fi 802.11 b/g/n, HSDPA 3.2 Mbit/s and HSUPA 2 Mbit/s.

This phone is available with both European/Asia 3G bandings and the North American 3G bandings.

Software features

User interface 

The phone is one of the few smartphones to feature the Samsung bada 2.0 operating system platform.

Applications 

By default, the phone comes with Picsel Viewer which is capable of reading. pdf and Microsoft Office file formats.

As for Samsung apps, users can also download applications, games and widgets from the application store.

Media support 
 Audio
 MP3, AAC, AAC+, e-AAC+, WMA, AMR, WAV, MP4, FLAC
 Video
 MPEG4, H.263, H.264, WMV, AVI, DivX, XviD, MKV

Android porting 

There are many Android Custom ROMs on this mobile, they go up to Android 4.4

See also 

 Exynos
 AMOLED
 Samsung Wave Y

References 

Bada (operating system)
S-8530
Mobile phones introduced in 2010
Discontinued smartphones